Ghattamaneni Ramesh Babu (13 October 1965 – 8 January 2022) was an Indian actor and film producer, who was known for his work in Telugu cinema. Babu made his on screen debut with the film Alluri Seetharama Raju in 1974. He acted in over 15 films before retiring from acting in 1997. In 2004, he became a producer and established Krishna Productions Private Ltd, a film production company named after his father. He produced films like Arjun and Athidhi, both of which had his brother Mahesh Babu in leading role. One of his last roles was as a presenter for the 2011 film Dookudu.

Early life
Ramesh Babu was born on 13 October 1965 in Chennai, Tamil Nadu to prominent Telugu film actor Krishna and his first wife Indira Devi. He is the first born to his parents. He has three younger sisters, actress-producer Manjula Ghattamaneni, Padmavathi and Priyadarshini and one younger brother, Mahesh Babu a prominent actor in Telugu Cinema.

Career

Acting career
In 1977, Ramesh Babu ventured into films as a child actor at the age of 12 with his father's film Manushulu Chesina Dongalu. After two years, at the age of 14, he was cast in a vital role in the film Needa, which was directed by Dasari Narayana Rao. The film also had his four-year-old brother, Mahesh Babu in a small role. After that, he took a brief hiatus from acting. In 1987, he made his comeback as a lead actor with the film Samraat, directed by V. Madhusudhana Rao. The film had Sonam paired alongside Ramesh and Sharada in a vital role. In 1988, he was seen in films such as Jandhyala's Chinni Krishnudu, A. Kodandarami Reddy's Bazaar Rowdy and in Kaliyuga Karnudu and Mugguru Kodukulu, both directed by his father. Mugguru Kodukulu also had his father and brother acting alongside him. Bazaar Rowdy became a blockbuster and giving Ramesh his first success as a solo hero. In 1989, he was seen in Dasari Narayana Rao's Black Tiger and V. Madhusudhana Rao's Krishna Gaari Abbayi. In 1990, he was seen in K. Murali Mohan Rao's Ayudham and S. S. Ravichandra's Kaliyuga Abhimanyudu. In 1991, he was seen in Naa Ille Naa Swargam, also starring his father. In 1993, he once again collaborated with Dasari Narayana Rao for the film Maama Kodalu and was also seen in Anna Chellelu opposite Aamani. In 1994, he was seen for the last time in a leading role in the film Pacha Thoranam. The film was directed by Adurthi Saibhaskar and had Rambha acting opposite Ramesh. In 1997, he was seen in a supporting role in N. Shankar's Encounter.

Film producer
In 2004, Ramesh Babu established a film production company named Krishna Productions Private Ltd in Hyderabad. He named the company after his father and ventured into film production with the film Arjun. Directed by Gunasekhar and starring his brother Mahesh Babu, Shriya Saran, Keerthi Reddy, Raja, Prakash Raj and Saritha, the film was successful at the box office and completed its 100-day theatrical run in 6 centres. His production house was praised for the  40 million worth Meenakshi Amman Temple set that was built by Thotta Tharani for the film. His next production venture was Athidhi. Directed by Surender Reddy, the film once again had his brother Mahesh Babu in lead role. Amrita Rao was paired opposite Mahesh and Murali Sharma in a negative role. For Athidhi, Ramesh Babu's production house collaborated with UTV Motion Pictures to produce the film. This was the first time a corporate company entered into Telugu film production. The film opened to negative reviews and failed at the box office. In 2011, he was seen as a presenter for the film Dookudu.

Personal life and death
Ramesh Babu died from the effects of liver disease on 8 January 2022, at the age of 56.

Filmography

As actor

As producer

References

External links
 

1965 births
2022 deaths
20th-century Indian male actors
21st-century Indian male actors
Telugu male actors
Male actors in Telugu cinema
Indian male film actors
Male actors from Hyderabad, India
Film producers from Hyderabad, India
Male actors from Chennai
Telugu film producers
Hindi film producers
Indian male child actors
Deaths from liver disease